Canacona railway station (Station code: CNO) is a small railway station in South Goa district, Goa. It serves Canacona, a sub-district ('taluka') in the extreme southernmost end of Goa. The station consists of two platforms of which one is high level platform and other is rail level platform. The high level platform is well sheltered. It has many facilities including drinking water cooler, gents and ladies washrooms and food stall.

Major trains 
 Madgaon–Mangaluru Central DEMU
 Karwar–Pernem DEMU
 Mangaluru Central–Madgaon Passenger
 Madgaon–Mangaluru Intercity Express

References

External links

Railway stations in South Goa district
Karwar railway division
Railway stations along Konkan Railway line
Railway stations opened in 1997